Kentucky Route 330 (KY 330) is a  state highway in the U.S. state of Kentucky. The highway connects mostly rural areas of Owen, Grant, and Pendleton counties with the Corinth and Falmouth areas.

Route description

Owen County
KY 330 begins at an intersection with KY 227 (Georgetown Road) in Hallam, within Owen County. It travels to the east and curves to the east-northeast. It intersects the northern terminus of KY 1883 and curves to the northeast. KY 330 crosses over Elk Creek and then Singer Run. It then curves to the north-northeast and has a brief concurrency with KY 845. KY 330 heads to the east-southeast and crosses over Eagle Creek. It travels through Lusbys Mill. The highway intersects the southern terminus of KY 3096 (Fortner Ridge Road) and travels to the south-southeast. It curves to the east-southeast and travels through Canby. It heads to the southeast and then travels along the Grant County line. While on the county line, it intersects the eastern terminus of KY 607 (New Columbus Drive). It then curves to the north-northeast and enters Grant County proper.

Grant County
KY 330 curves to the northeast and has an interchange with Interstate 75 (I-75). It then passes Ecklers Cemetery before it enters Corinth. There, it intersects U.S. Route 25 (US 25; Cincinnati Road). They travel concurrently to the north-northwest, through the city. When they split, KY 330 heads to the east-southeast, crosses over some railroad tracks, curves to the northeast, and leaves the city limits of Corinth. The highway then begins paralleling Crooked Creek. In Cordova, it has a very brief concurrency with KY 36 (Cordova Road). It heads to the east and leaves the creek before it curves to the north-northeast. Then, it enters Pendleton County.

Pendleton County
KY 330 gradually curves to the east-northeast and then back to the north-northeast. It passes Morgan Cemetery and then begins paralleling the South Fork Licking Creek. It begins a concurrency with KY 1054 just west of Morgan. They curve to the northwest and intersect the eastern terminus of Gumlick Road. Here, they turn right, to the northeast, and immediately cross the South Fork Licking River. They curve to the north-northeast and split. KY 330 heads to the northeast and crosses over Middle Creek. It curves to the north-northeast and then crosses over Short Creek. The highway curves to the northwest and meets its eastern terminus, an intersection with US 27/KY 22, at a point just northwest of Falmouth. Here, the roadway continues as Monroe Road.

Major intersections

See also

References

0330
Transportation in Owen County, Kentucky
Transportation in Grant County, Kentucky
Transportation in Pendleton County, Kentucky